Without Remorse is a thriller novel, written by Tom Clancy and published on August 11, 1993. Set during the Vietnam War, it serves as an origin story of  John Clark, one of the recurring characters in the Ryanverse. Without Remorse introduces Clark as former Navy SEAL John Kelly and explains how he changed his name. G.P. Putnam's Sons paid $14 million for the North American rights, a record for a single book. The book debuted at number one on The New York Times Best Seller list.

Plot
In 1970, former Navy SEAL John Kelly, who recently lost his pregnant wife, Patricia, in a car accident, picks up a hitchhiker named Pam on his way to his home on Battery Island in the Chesapeake Bay. They quickly become lovers, and over time Kelly discovers her full name, Pamela Madden, and that she is a runaway who became a drug mule and prostitute; she has recently escaped from her drug-dealer/pimp Henry Tucker. Kelly, along with the help of doctors Sam and Sarah Rosen, helps rehabilitate her from barbiturates. Weeks after recovering, Kelly and Pam go to Baltimore for follow-up treatment. Kelly takes them scouting through the neighborhood where her pimps work. One of them recognizes Pam and pursues them in a car chase. Kelly is gravely wounded by a shotgun blast, while Pam is recaptured and later tortured, gang-raped, and killed.

In Vietnam, a U.S. target drone (specified in the book as a buffalo hunter) discovers Air Force Colonel Robin Zacharias as a prisoner of war in a secret camp administered by the NVA. Since Zacharias possesses highly classified knowledge and has been declared killed in action, Admiral Dutch Maxwell arranges a secret rescue mission for him as well as other American POWs held in the camp. Unbeknownst to them, Soviet colonel Nikolay Grishanov has been interrogating the prisoners; he later lobbies his government to transport Zacharias and his fellow prisoners into the Soviet Union, citing their intelligence value. However, friction between the Soviets and the North Vietnamese leads the latter to decide to kill the POWs.

Meanwhile, Kelly recovers from his wounds with the help of Dr. Rosen and his head nurse, Sandra "Sandy" O'Toole. Vowing to exact revenge on the people responsible for Pam's death, he wages a private war on Tucker's drug ring, eliminating some of its players and saving some female drug mules in the process. He recruits Rosen and O'Toole to help rehabilitate one of the rescued prostitutes, Doris Brown. He later obtains more information on the drug ring from brutally torturing one of Pam's pimps, William Grayson, using a pressure chamber designed to simulate deep-water diving conditions; he is then left to die from severe decompression sickness. However, his specialized tactics, including advanced close-quarters combat, camouflaging himself as a homeless man, meticulous intelligence gathering, and manufacturing of suppressors for his firearms draw the attention of local investigators, particularly Emmet Ryan, who investigated Kelly's initial altercation and Pam's subsequent death. 

Later, Kelly is approached by Admiral Maxwell to act as the pathfinder for the rescue mission on Zacharias and other American POWs, since he is familiar with the area from his days in the UDT and had previously gone behind enemy lines to rescue Maxwell's son. Kelly pauses his personal vendetta, and proceeds to Vietnam. A KGB mole informs the Soviets of the rescue mission, compromising it. However, Kelly manages to capture Grishanov while escaping from the camp, who is then used as leverage to negotiate the transfer of Colonel Zacharias and his fellow prisoners to the Hanoi Hilton, where they will be confirmed as alive and eventually returned.

Upon returning from Vietnam, Kelly finds out that Doris and her father Raymond had been killed and continues his mission. He finds out that the heroin processed by Tucker's drug ring was smuggled into the U.S. through the corpses of dead American soldiers, and also deduces that a corrupt police officer is on Tucker's payroll. Meanwhile, the CIA try to recruit him following his actions in Vietnam, and due to Kelly's difficult position, they agree to help him escape his legal troubles in return for the assassination of the mole who had jeopardized the Vietnam operation. Kelly forces the supposed mole, an aide to the Special Assistant to the National Security Advisor, to kill himself,  inadvertently leaving the real mole, a Senate aide and anti-war activist, active. He then rushes to complete his vendetta, finally killing Tucker and his remaining cohorts. Corrupt police Lieutenant Mark Charon is incidentally murdered by the criminals.

Ryan deduces that Kelly is the vigilante targeting drug dealers and their corrupt police partners. He confronts him on his boat, where Kelly confesses. He bargains with the detective for one more hour of liberty before being arrested; Ryan agrees, but Kelly fakes his death by capsizing his boat. He is then rescued by his CIA superiors, who recruit him under his new identity as John Clark. He quietly resumes contact with O'Toole and marries her. Three years later, Zacharias and his fellow POWs are released after the end of the American involvement in the Vietnam War.

Characters

Baltimore
 John Terrence Kelly: Former Navy SEAL, later a full-time operative for the Central Intelligence Agency under the name John Clark.
 Pamela "Pam" Madden: Kelly's lover. Drug mule and prostitute who escaped from Henry Tucker
 Dr Sam Rosen: Professor of neurosurgery at Johns Hopkins University.
 Dr Sarah Rosen: Pharmacologist and professor at Johns Hopkins University, Dr. Sam Rosen's wife.
 Sandra "Sandy" O'Toole: a Vietnam war widow and nurse-practitioner at Johns Hopkins Hospital.
 Henry Tucker: Pimp and leader of the Baltimore drug ring.  He is possibly inspired by Frank Lucas.  Tucker, like the real-life Lucas, is an African American drug lord who is smuggling heroin into the United States using military transport planes.
 William "Billy" Grayson: Drug dealer working for Tucker.
 Tony Piaggi: A drug dealer, member of the Baltimore Mafia, and a major distributor of Tucker's heroin.
 Doris Brown: Pam's fellow drug mule and prostitute.
 Lt Emmet Ryan: Lieutenant at the Baltimore Police Department (Homicide Division) and Jack Ryan's father. Jack himself also appears briefly to announce his decision to join the Marines to his parents.
 Lt Mark Charon: Lieutenant at the Baltimore City Police Department (Narcotics Division), on Tucker's payroll
 Manuel "Portagee" Oreza: Quartermaster First Class for the United States Coast Guard, Kelly's friend. Pursued Kelly when he faked his death, believes him to be dead.

Vietnam
 Colonel Robin Zacharias: fighter-bomber pilot for the United States Air Force who helped in the formulation of the Strategic Air Command war plans. Shot down and captured by the North Vietnamese Army during a Wild Weasel attack on their SAM sites.
 Colonel Nikolay Yevgeniyevich "Kolya" Grishanov: The sole interrogator at the POW camp holding Zacharias.
 Vice Admiral Winslow Holland "Dutch" Maxwell: Assistant chief of naval operations (Air) for the United States Navy. Formed the rescue mission (codename "Boxwood Green") and personally recruited Kelly to take part in the operation.
 Rear Admiral Casimir Podulski: Aide to Vice Admiral Maxwell. Involved in the planning and execution of Boxwood Green
 Admiral James Greer: Rear admiral for the U.S. Navy who started working for the CIA. Supervised Boxwood Green and later recruits Kelly into the agency.
 Robert Ritter: Senior executive in the Operations Division of the CIA. Supervised Boxwood Green and also recruits Kelly into the agency.
 Walter "Wally" Hicks: Aide to the Special Assistant to the National Security Advisor. Misidentified as the KGB mole by Ritter and was killed by Kelly under the pretense of a heroin overdose.
 Peter Henderson: Minor Senate aide, revealed to be a KGB mole (codename "Cassius") that burned Boxwood Green. Appears in Red Rabbit (2002); later caught by the CIA in The Hunt for Red October (1984) and made as double agent. He was later offered his freedom in The Cardinal of the Kremlin (1988) due to the importance of secret information on the Soviet Union that he brought.

Themes
Without Remorse is said to be inspired by David Morrell's novel First Blood (1972) as well a string of action films that feature violent and "psycho" Vietnam veterans of the 1980s. Clancy subverted the cliché by framing Kelly's rage and frustration as "pro-social". Moreover, it gave him a platform to express his disgust with the U.S. government for neglecting Vietnam veterans, who "understand the arts of war".

Regarding the message of the novel, Clancy said: "The central question in this book is: What is justice? And how is justice applied? What if you're in the situation where a great wrong has been done and the law does not respond to it? Now, is your duty as a citizen just to forget about it and permit society as a whole to make that mistake? Or is your duty as a citizen to become the instrument of justice, if you can do so in a controlled and structured and just way? Do you have the moral right to become the instrument of justice yourself?"

Development
Clancy started working on Without Remorse in 1971. He later went back to the previously abandoned story in 1992, spending about four months on the novel. He explained the process: "You gotta tell a good story if people are going to read it. I think you have an ethical obligation to deal with those issues as truthfully as possible. So, there's an educational aspect to what I do."

In 1992, Putnam paid $14 million for the North American rights, a record for a single book.

Reception
Commercially, the book debuted at number one on the New York Times bestseller list for the week of August 29, 1993.

Critically, Without Remorse received generally positive reviews. Dallas Morning News hailed it as "Mr. Clancy's best", while the San Diego Union-Tribune praised it as "a non-stop emotional roller coaster". However, Kirkus Reviews gave it a mixed verdict, stating that it is "twice as long as the two rather creaky storylines can bear, but the millions of midlevel, desk-bound, action-loving bureaucrats whose adventurous wishes Clancy so faithfully fulfills are unlikely to complain." Publishers Weekly also gave it a mixed review, bemoaning Clancy's "attempts to rationalize this amoral crusade with passages of introspection by characters who are either noble warriors or human scum" as well as "failings of style and moral judgment"; however, they agree that "this overlong, often melodramatic novel seems destined to follow its predecessors to the top of the bestseller lists."

Film adaptation

Savoy Pictures first bought the film rights to Without Remorse soon after the novel was released for $2.5 million. At one point, Keanu Reeves was offered the role as Clark for $7 million but declined. Variety magazine reported that Laurence Fishburne and Gary Sinise were later attached to star in the adaptation; however, production was shut down due to script problems and financial woes with the production company. The film went under development hell for years until Christopher McQuarrie signed on with Paramount Pictures to direct the adaptation in 2012. Tom Hardy was approached by Paramount to play Clark, and Kevin Costner was slated to reprise his role as mentor William Harper from another Clancy-based film, Jack Ryan: Shadow Recruit (2014), but this version was scrapped.

In 2017, it was announced that Akiva Goldsman signed on with the same studio to produce another film adaptation starring Clark, Rainbow Six. On September 20, 2018, Michael B. Jordan was announced to be playing the character in a two-part film series, which will be composed of Without Remorse and Rainbow Six and with Goldsman, Jordan, Josh Appelbaum, and Andre Nemec producing. Stefano Sollima is currently in talks to direct the film. On January 9, 2019, Variety announced that Taylor Sheridan will rewrite the screenplay. Tom Clancy's Without Remorse was released on Prime Video on April 30, 2021

References

1993 American novels
American thriller novels
Techno-thriller novels
Prequel novels
Novels by Tom Clancy
Ryanverse
Novels set during the Vietnam War
G. P. Putnam's Sons books
Novels about prisoners of war
Novels set in Vietnam
Novels set in Baltimore
Novels set in Washington, D.C.
Novels set in Pittsburgh